Puerto Cisnes Airport  is an airport serving Puerto Cisnes, a port town on the Puyuhuapi Channel in the Aysén Region of Chile.

There are hills northeast and southwest of the runway.

See also

Transport in Chile
List of airports in Chile

References

External links
OpenStreetMap - Puerto Cisnes
OurAirports - Puerto Cisnes
FallingRain - Puerto Cisnes Airport

Airports in Chile
Airports in Aysén Region